Joshua Timothy "Josh" Levi (born 14 July 1979) is a professional rugby union player from New Zealand.

Career
Levi attended Auckland Grammar School. He first played rugby union for the Marist under 6's Counties Manukau. He also played in the Manurewa Rugby Union under 19 team winning the under 19's championship in 1998. Levi is a utility backline player, he has played halfback, first five-eighths, second five-eighths, centre, fullback and wing.

He played for Counties Manukau, Auckland Blues colts (1998–1999), Waikato Chiefs colts (1999), Highlanders Colts (2000–?), Northland Rugby Union (2003–2007), Venezia Mestre Rugby Union Italy club (2006–2009) and Yamaha Jubilo Japan since 2009 where he tends to play second five-eighths or centre positions. His father is a pastor of a mission church Providence Presbyterian part of the Grace Presbyterian Church of New Zealand denomination.

References

External links
Player Profile (In Japanese)

1979 births
People educated at Auckland Grammar School
Living people
New Zealand rugby union players
Venezia Mestre Rugby FC players
Shizuoka Blue Revs players
Counties Manukau rugby union players
Northland rugby union players
New Zealand expatriate rugby union players
Expatriate rugby union players in Italy
Expatriate rugby union players in Japan
New Zealand expatriate sportspeople in Japan
New Zealand expatriate sportspeople in Italy
Rugby union players from Auckland
Rugby union centres